Yes and no, or word pairs with similar words, are expressions of the affirmative and the negative, respectively, in several languages, including English. Some languages make a distinction between answers to affirmative versus negative questions and  may have three-form or four-form systems. English originally used a four-form system up to and including Early Middle English and Modern English has reduced to a two-form system consisting of 'yes' and 'no'. It exists in many facets of communication, such as: eye blink communication, head movements, Morse Code, and sign language. Some languages, such as Latin, do not have yes-no word systems.

Answering yes/no question with single words meaning 'yes' or 'no' is by no means universal. Probably about half the world's languages typically employ an echo response: repeating the verb in the question in an affirmative or a negative form. Some of these also have optional words for 'yes' and 'no', like Hungarian, Russian, and Portuguese. Others simply don't have designated yes/no words, like Welsh, Irish,  Latin, Thai, and Chinese. Echo responses avoid the issue of what an unadorned yes means in response to a negative question. Yes and no can be used as a response to a variety of situationsbut are better suited when asked simple questions. While a yes response to the question, "You don't like strawberries?" is ambiguous in English, the Welsh response  (I am) has no ambiguity.

The words yes and no are not easily classified into any of the eight conventional parts of speech. Sometimes they are classified as interjections, although they do not qualify as such, and they are not adverbs. They are sometimes classified as a part of speech in their own right, sentence words, or pro-sentences, although that category contains more than yes and no, and not all linguists include them in their lists of sentence words. Sentences consisting solely of one of these two words are classified as minor sentences.

Classification of English grammar 
Although sometimes classified as interjections, these words do not express emotion or act as calls for attention; they are not adverbs because they do not qualify any verb, adjective, or adverb. They are sometimes classified as a part of speech in their own right: sentence words or word sentences.

This is the position of Otto Jespersen, who states that Yes' and 'No'... are to all intents and purposes sentences just as much as the most delicately balanced sentences ever uttered by Demosthenes or penned by Samuel Johnson."

Georg von der Gabelentz, Henry Sweet, and Philipp Wegener have all written on the subject of sentence words. Both Sweet and Wegener include yes and no in this category, with Sweet treating them separately from both imperatives and interjections, although Gabelentz does not.

Watts classifies yes and no as grammatical particles, in particular response particles. He also notes their relationship to the interjections oh and ah, which is that the interjections can precede yes and no but not follow them. Oh as an interjection expresses surprise, but in the combined forms oh yes and oh no merely acts as an intensifier; but ah in the combined forms ah yes and ah no retains its stand-alone meaning, of focusing upon the previous speaker's or writer's last statement. The forms *yes oh, *yes ah, *no oh, and *no ah are grammatically ill-formed. Aijmer similarly categorizes the yes and no as response signals or reaction signals.

Ameka classifies these two words in different ways according to the context. When used as back-channel items, he classifies them as interjections; but when they are used as the responses to a yes–no question, he classifies them as formulaic words. The distinction between an interjection and a formula is, in Ameka's view, that the former does not have an addressee (although it may be directed at a person), whereas the latter does. The yes or no in response to the question is addressed at the interrogator, whereas yes or no used as a back-channel item is a feedback usage, an utterance that is said to oneself. However, Sorjonen criticizes this analysis as lacking empirical work on the other usages of these words, in addition to interjections and feedback uses.

Bloomfield and Hockett classify the words, when used to answer yes-no questions, as special completive interjections. They classify sentences comprising solely one of these two words as minor sentences.

Sweet classifies the words in several ways. They are sentence-modifying adverbs, adverbs that act as modifiers to an entire sentence. They are also sentence words, when standing alone. They may, as question responses, also be absolute forms that correspond to what would otherwise be the not in a negated echo response. For example, a "No." in response to the question "Is he here?" is equivalent to the echo response "He is not here." Sweet observes that there is no correspondence with a simple yes in the latter situation, although the sentence-word "Certainly." provides an absolute form of an emphatic echo response "He is certainly here." Many other adverbs can also be used as sentence words in this way.

Unlike yes, no can also be an adverb of degree, applying to adjectives solely in the comparative (e.g., no greater, no sooner, but not no soon or no soonest), and an adjective when applied to nouns (e.g., "He is no fool." and Dyer's "No clouds, no vapours intervene.").

Grammarians of other languages have created further, similar, special classifications for these types of words. Tesnière classifies the French oui and non as phrasillons logiques (along with voici). Fonagy observes that such a classification may be partly justified for the former two, but suggests that pragmatic holophrases is more appropriate.

The Early English four-form system 
While Modern English has a two-form system of yes and no for affirmatives and negatives, earlier forms of English had a four-form system, comprising the words yea, nay, yes, and no. Yes contradicts a negatively formulated question, No affirms it; Yea affirms a positively formulated question, Nay contradicts it.

Will they not go? — Yes, they will.
Will they not go? — No, they will not.
Will they go? — Yea, they will.
Will they go? — Nay, they will not.

This is illustrated by the following passage from Much Ado about Nothing:

Benedick's answer of yea is a correct application of the rule, but as observed by W. A. Wright "Shakespeare does not always observe this rule, and even in the earliest times the usage appears not to have been consistent." Furness gives as an example the following, where Hermia's answer should, in following the rule, have been yes:

This subtle grammatical feature of Early Modern English is recorded by Sir Thomas More in his critique of William Tyndale's translation of the New Testament into Early Modern English, which was then quoted as an authority by later scholars:

In fact, More's exemplification of the rule actually contradicts his statement of what the rule is. This went unnoticed by scholars such as Horne Tooke, Robert Gordon Latham, and Trench, and was first pointed out by George Perkins Marsh in his Century Dictionary, where he corrects More's incorrect statement of the first rule, "No aunswereth the question framed by the affirmative.", to read nay. That even More got the rule wrong, even while himself dressing down Tyndale for getting it wrong, is seen by Furness as evidence that the four word system was "too subtle a distinction for practice".

Marsh found no evidence of a four-form system in Mœso-Gothic, although he reported finding "traces" in Old English. He observed that in the Anglo-Saxon Gospels,
positively phrased questions are answered positively with gea (John 21:15,16, King James Version: "Jesus saith to Simon Peter, Simon, son of Jonas, lovest thou me more than these? He saith unto him, Yea, Lord; thou knowest that I love thee" etc.)
and negatively with ne (Luke 12:51, KJ: "Suppose ye that I am come to give peace on earth? I tell you, Nay; but rather division"; 13:4,5, KJ: "Or those eighteen, upon whom the tower in Siloam fell, and slew them, think ye that they were sinners above all men that dwelt in Jerusalem? I tell you, Nay: but, except ye repent, ye shall all likewise perish."), nese (John 21:5 "Then Jesus saith unto them, Children, have ye any meat? They answered him, No."; Matthew 13:28,29, KJ: "The servants said unto him, Wilt thou then that we go and gather them up? But he said, Nay; lest while ye gather up the tares, ye root up also the wheat with them."), and nic meaning "not I" (John 18:17, KJ: "Then saith the damsel that kept the door unto Peter, Art not thou also one of this man's disciples? He saith, I am not.");
while negatively phrased questions are answered positively with gyse (Matthew 17:25, KJ: "they that received tribute money came to Peter, and said, Doth not your master pay tribute? He saith, Yes.")
and negatively for example with nâ, meaning "no one" (John 8:10,11, "he said unto her, Woman, where are those thine accusers? hath no man condemned thee? She said, No man, Lord.").

Marsh calls this four-form system of Early Modern English a "needless subtlety". Tooke called it a "ridiculous distinction", with Marsh concluding that Tooke believed Thomas More to have simply made this rule up and observing that Tooke is not alone in his disbelief of More. Marsh, however, points out (having himself analyzed the works of John Wycliffe, Geoffrey Chaucer, John Gower, John Skelton, and Robert of Gloucester, and Piers Plowman and Le Morte d'Arthur) that the distinction both existed and was generally and fairly uniformly observed in Early Modern English from the time of Chaucer to the time of Tyndale. But after the time of Tyndale, the four-form system was rapidly replaced by the modern two-form system.

Three-form systems 
Several languages have a three-form system, with two affirmative words and one negative. In a three-form system, the affirmative response to a positively phrased question is the unmarked affirmative, the affirmative response to a negatively phrased question is the marked affirmative, and the negative response to both forms of question is the (single) negative. For example, in Norwegian the affirmative answer to "Snakker du norsk?" ("Do you speak Norwegian?") is "Ja", and the affirmative answer to "Snakker du ikke norsk?" ("Do you not speak Norwegian?") is "Jo", while the negative answer to both questions is "Nei".

Danish, Swedish, Norwegian, Icelandic, Faroese, Hungarian, German, Dutch, French and Malayalam all have three-form systems. Though, technically Malayalam is a multi-form system of Yes and No as can be seen from below, the former are the formal words for Yes and No.

Swedish, and to some extent Danish and Norwegian, also have additional forms javisst and jovisst, analogous to ja and jo, to indicate a strong affirmative response. Swedish (and Danish and Norwegian slang) also have the forms joho and nehej, which both indicate stronger response than jo or nej. Jo can also be used as an emphatic contradiction of a negative statement. These words also sound more polite as they don't sound like curt when saying "No!" or "Yes!".  means "it is there" and the word behaves as an affirmative response like . It is used to answer affirmatively to questions to confirm any action by the asker, but to answer negatively one says .  and  both mean to "want" and to "not want".

Other languages with four-form systems 
Like Early Modern English, the Romanian language has a four-form system. The affirmative and negative responses to positively phrased questions are da and nu, respectively. But in responses to negatively phrased questions they are prefixed with ba (i.e. ba da and ba nu). nu is also used as a negation adverb, infixed between subject and verb. Thus, for example, the affirmative response to the negatively phrased question "N-ai plătit?" ("Didn't you pay?") is "Ba da." ("Yes."—i.e. "I did pay."), and the negative response to a positively phrased question beginning "Se poate să ...?" ("Is it possible to ...?") is "Nu, nu se poate." ("No, it is not possible."—note the use of nu for both no and negation of the verb.)

Related words in other languages and translation problems 
Bloomfield and Hockett observe that not all languages have special completive interjections.

Finnish 
Finnish does not generally answer yes-no questions with either adverbs or interjections but answers them with a repetition of the verb in the question, negating it if the answer is the negative. (This is an echo response.) The answer to "" ("Are you coming from town?") is the verb form itself, "" ("We are coming.") However, in spoken Finnish, a simple "Yes" answer is somewhat more common, ""

Negative questions are answered similarly. Negative answers are just the negated verb form. The answer to "" ("Do you know Mr Lehto?") is "" ("I don't know.") or simply "." ("I don't."). However, Finnish also has particle words for "yes": "" (formal) and "" (colloquial). A yes-no question can be answered "yes" with either "" or "", which are not conjugated according to the person and plurality of the verb. "", however, is always conjugated and means "no".

Estonian
Estonian has a structure similar to Finnish, with both repetitions and interjections.  means "yes". Unlike Finnish, the negation particle is always , regardless of person and plurality.

The word , cognate to Finnish , can be used to reply positively to a negative question:  ("You don't speak Finnish?" "Yes, I do!") It can also be used to approve a positive statement:  ("You (unexpectedly) came along!" "Yes I did.")

Latvian 
Up until the 16th century Latvian did not have a word for "yes" and the common way of responding affirmatively to a question was by repeating the question's verb, just as in Finnish. The modern day  was borrowed from Middle High German  and first appeared in 16th-century religious texts, especially catechisms, in answers to questions about faith. At that time such works were usually translated from German by non-Latvians that had learned Latvian as a foreign language. By the 17th century,  was being used by some Latvian speakers that lived near the cities, and more frequently when speaking to non-Latvians, but they would revert to agreeing by repeating the question verb when talking among themselves. Only in the mid-19th century did  really become usual everywhere.

Welsh 
It is often assumed that Welsh has no words at all for yes and no. However, these are used only in specialized circumstances and are some of the  ways in Welsh of saying yes or no. Ie and nage are used to respond to sentences of simple identification, while do and naddo are used to respond to questions specifically in the past tense. As in Finnish, the main way to state yes or no, in answer to yes-no questions, is to echo the verb of the question. The answers to "" ("Is Ffred coming?") are either "" ("He is (coming).") or "" ("He is not (coming)"). For more information on yes and no answers to yes-no questions in Welsh, see Jones, listed in further reading.

Goidelic languages 
The Goidelic languages (Irish, Scottish Gaelic and Manx) do not have words for yes or no at all. Instead, an echo response of the main verb used to ask the question is used. For example, the Irish question "" ("Is he coming?") may be answered "" ("Is") or "" ("Is not"). More frequently, another verb will be used. For example, to respond to "" ("Did he hear?"), "" ("Heard") or "" ("Did not hear") are used. Irish people frequently give echo answers in English as well, e.g. "Did you hear?" Answer "I heard/I did".

Latin 
Latin has no single words for yes and no. Their functions as word sentence responses to yes-no questions are taken up by sentence adverbs, single adverbs that are sentence modifiers and also used as word sentences. They express the speaker's/writer's feelings about the truth value of a proposition. They, in conjunction with the negator , are used as responses to yes-no questions. For example:

Latin also employs echo responses.

Galician and Portuguese 
However, answering a question with them is less idiomatic than answering with the verb in the proper conjugation.

Spanish 
In Spanish, the words  'yes' and  'no' are unambiguously classified as adverbs: serving as answers to questions and also modifying verbs. The affirmative  can replace the verb after a negation ( = I don't own a car, but he does) or intensify it (I don't believe he owns a car. / He does own one! = ). The word  is the standard adverb placed next to a verb to negate it ( = I don't own a car). Double negation is normal and valid in Spanish, and it is interpreted as reinforcing the negation ( = I own no car).

Chinese 
Speakers of Chinese use echo responses. In all Sinitic/Chinese languages, yes-no questions are often posed in A-not-A form, and the replies to such questions are echo answers that echo either A or not A. In Standard Mandarin Chinese, the closest equivalents to yes and no are to state "" and "". Similarly, in Cantonese, the preceding are 係 hai6 (lit: "is") and 唔係 (lit: "not is") m4 hai6, respectively. One can also answer 冇錯 mou5 co3 for the affirmative, although there is no corresponding negative to this.

Japanese 
Japanese lacks words for yes and no. The words "" (hai) and "" (iie) are mistaken by English speakers for equivalents to yes and no, but they actually signify agreement or disagreement with the proposition put by the question: "That's right." or "That's not right."  For example: if asked, answering with the affirmative "はい" would mean "Right, I am not going"; whereas in English, answering "yes" would be to contradict the negative question. Echo responses are not uncommon in Japanese.

Complications 
These differences between languages make translation difficult. No two languages are isomorphic at the most elementary level of words for yes and no. Translation from two-form to three-form systems are equivalent to what English-speaking school children learning French or German encounter. The mapping becomes complex when converting two-form to three-form systems. There are many idioms, such as reduplication (in French, German, and Italian) of affirmatives for emphasis (the German ).

The mappings are one-to-many in both directions. The German  has no fewer than 13 English equivalents that vary according to context and usage (yes, yeah, and no when used as an answer; well, all right, so, and now, when used for segmentation; oh, ah, uh, and eh when used an interjection; and do you, will you, and their various inflections when used as a marker for tag questions) for example.

Translation from languages that have word systems to those that do not, such as Latin, is similarly problematic. As Calvert says, "Saying yes or no takes a little thought in Latin".

Colloquial forms

Non-verbal
These forms are particularly useful for speakers who are at a given time unable to articulate the actual words yes and no. The use of short vocalizations like uh-huh, mm-hmm, and yeah are examples of non-verbal communication, and in particular the practice of backchanneling.

Art historian Robert Farris Thompson has posited that mm-hmm may be a loanword from a West African language that entered the English vernacular from the speech of enslaved Africans; linguist Lev Michael, however, says that this proposed origin is implausible, and linguist Roslyn Burns states that the origin of the term is difficult to confirm.

Aye and variants
The word aye as a synonym for yes in response to a question dates to the 1570s. According to the Online Etymology Dictionary, it is of unknown origin. It may derive from the word I (in the context of "I assent"); as an alteration of the Middle English  ("yes"); or the adverb aye (meaning always "always, ever"), which comes from the Old Norse . Using aye to mean yes is archaic, having disappeared from most of the English-speaking world, but is notably still used by people from Scotland, Ulster, and the north of England.

In December 1993, a witness in a Scottish court who had answered "aye" to confirm he was the person summoned was told by a sheriff judge that he must answer either yes or no. When his name was read again and he was asked to confirm it, he answered "aye" again, and was imprisoned for 90 minutes for contempt of court. On his release he said, "I genuinely thought I was answering him."

Aye is also a common word in parliamentary procedure, where the phrase the ayes have it means that a motion has passed. In the House of Commons of the British Parliament, MPs vote orally by saying "aye" or "no" to indicate they approve or disapprove of the measure or piece of legislation. (In the House of Lords, by contrast, members say "content" or "not content" when voting).

The term has also historically been used in nautical usage, often phrased as "aye, aye, sir" duplicating the word "aye". Fowler's Dictionary of Modern English Usage (1926) explained that the nautical phrase was at that time usually written ay, ay, sir.

The informal, affirmative phrase why-aye (also rendered whey-aye or way-eye) is used in the dialect of northeast England, most notably by Geordies.

Other
Other variants of "yes" include acha in informal Indian English and historically righto or righty-ho in upper-class British English, although these fell out of use during the early 20th century.

See also 
Affirmation and negation
Thumb signal
Translation
Untranslatability

References

Further reading 
 —Jones' analysis of how to answer questions with "yes" or "no" in the Welsh language, broken down into a typology of echo and non-echo responsives, polarity and truth-value responses, and numbers of forms
 
 
  Pdf. 

English grammar
English words
History of the English language
Parts of speech

br:Sí
de:Ja
es:Sí
es:No
eo:Jes
it:Sì
ja:はい
no:Ja
sk:Áno
yi:יא